Arthur Rigby (born Arthur Turner; 27 September 1900 – 25 April 1971) was an English actor and writer. He was best known for playing Sgt Flint on the TV series Dixon of Dock Green, appearing in 253 episodes from 1955 to 1965. He also appeared with Dixon 's star Jack Warner in the 1949 film The Blue Lamp, which was also the film in which the character of PC George Dixon was created.

As a writer, Rigby co-wrote the book (with Stanley Lupino), for the musical play So This is Love, which ran for 321 performances at the Winter Garden Theatre in London's West End in 1928. This was adapted to film twice, first as Love Lies, in 1932, and then as Lucky to Me in 1939. Rigby also co-wrote (with Stanley Brightman), the musical comedy Darling, I Love You, which ran for 147 performances at London's Gaiety Theatre in 1930, and was also later filmed as The Deputy Drummer (1935). He additionally supplied stories and scripts for the films Puppets of Fate (1933), Who's Your Father?, Trust the Navy (both 1935), and Hot News (1936).

His parents were the actors Arthur Rigby Sr. and Mary Rigby; and Rigby was sometimes credited as Arthur Rigby Jr.

Filmography

References
  See Wikipedia entry on "Dixon of Dock Green"; also "Who's Who in the Theatre," 16th edition (1977), page 1065.

External links

1900 births
1971 deaths
20th-century English male actors
Male actors from London
English male stage actors
English male film actors
English male television actors